Edwin Collins Miller (November 24, 1888 – April 17, 1980) was a Major League Baseball first baseman who played for three seasons. He played for the St. Louis Browns in 1912 and 1914 and the Cleveland Indians in 1918.

External links

1888 births
1980 deaths
Major League Baseball first basemen
St. Louis Browns players
Cleveland Indians players
Minor league baseball managers
Waterbury Invincibles players
Lancaster Red Roses players
Waterbury Finnegans players
Memphis Turtles players
Waterbury Champs players
Lowell Grays players
New Haven White Wings players
Louisville Colonels (minor league) players
Galveston Pirates players
New Orleans Pelicans (baseball) players
Newark Bears (IL) players
Rochester Hustlers players
Buffalo Bisons (minor league) players
Jersey City Skeeters players
Hartford Senators players
Pittsfield Hillies players
Baseball players from Pennsylvania